Hirtopelta is a genus of sea snails, marine gastropod mollusks in the family Peltospiridae.

Species
Species within the genus Hirtopelta include:
 Hirtopelta hirta McLean, 1989
 Hirtopelta tufari Beck, 2002

References

 Warén A. & Bouchet P. (1993) New records, species, genera, and a new family of gastropods from hydrothermal vents and hydrocarbon seeps. Zoologica Scripta 22: 1-90

Peltospiridae